Nontobeko Eveline Vilakazi is a South African politician serving as the Northern Cape MEC for Social Development since June 2020. She has been a Member of the Northern Cape Provincial Legislature since May 2019. From May 2019 to June 2020, she was the Northern Cape MEC for Transport and Safety Liaison. Vilakazi is a member of the African National Congress and the provincial secretary of the party's women's league.

Politics
Vilakazi serves as the provincial secretary of the African National Congress Women's League.

Provincial government
Vilakazi was nominated to the Northern Cape Provincial Legislature following the general election held on 8 May 2019, as she was placed 12th on the ANC's list and the party won 18 seats. She was sworn in as a member on 22 May. On 29 May, newly elected premier Zamani Saul announced his executive council. Vilakazi was appointed as the Member of the Executive Council for Transport and Safety Liaison. She took office on the same day.

On 26 June 2020, she was appointed MEC for Social Development. She assumed the position on the same day and succeeded Martha Bartlett, who was sworn in as a Delegate of the National Council of Provinces. Nomandla Bloem took over as MEC for Transport and Safety Liaison.

References

External links
 Ms Nontobeko Vilakazi at Northern Cape Provincial Legislature
 

|-

Living people
African National Congress politicians
People from the Northern Cape
Members of the Northern Cape Provincial Legislature
Year of birth missing (living people)